Norton Healthcare is a Kentucky health care system with more than 40 clinics and hospitals in and around Louisville, Kentucky.  The hospital and health care system is the Louisville area's third largest private employer, located at more than 140 locations throughout Greater Louisville and Southern Indiana. The Louisville-based system includes six hospitals (one being in Madison, Indiana) with 1,993 licensed beds, eight outpatient centers, 18 Norton Immediate Care Centers, over 1,700 employees, over 1,500 employed medical providers, and approximately 2,000 total physicians on its medical staff.

History
What is now known as the predecessor to Norton Healthcare originally started with the actions of the Home Mission Society of St. Paul's Episcopal Church.  Mary Louise Sutton Norton led this group to create the John N. Norton Memorial Infirmary in 1886, which was named in honor of her late husband.  The hospital system has had multiple influences from religious groups over the years, including the Episcopal Church, United Methodist Church, United Church of Christ, and the Roman Catholic and Presbyterian communities, all of which were dedicated to promoting the idea of health and medical care for the sick and less fortunate.

Also of note is Norton Children's Hospital, opened in 1892 as Children's Free Hospital. The 267-bed hospital serves as the primary pediatric teaching facility for the University of Louisville School of Medicine.

Major facilities

The system's most notable locations are five acute care hospitals located within Metro Louisville:

Norton Children's Hospital (300 licensed beds)
Norton Audubon Hospital (432 licensed beds)
Norton Hospital & Norton Healthcare Pavilion (634 licensed beds)
Norton Women's & Children's Hospital (373 licensed beds)
Clark Memorial Hospital (241 licensed beds)
Norton Brownsboro Hospital (127 licensed beds)

Additionally, Norton Healthcare provides services through 12 immediate care centers in the Louisville area.

Major service lines

 Norton Cancer Institute - Treatments for brain tumors, bladder cancer, bone cancer, breast cancer, cervical cancer, colon cancer, kidney cancer, leukemia, liver cancer, lung cancer, lymphoma, bone marrow cancer, ovarian cancer, prostate cancer, skin cancer and uterine cancer.
 Norton Heart Care - Provides diagnostic, medical, interventional and surgical care to patients from Kentucky and Southern Indiana. Norton Audubon Hospital, Norton Brownsboro Hospital and Norton Hospital are accredited Chest Pain Centers certified through the Society of Cardiovascular Patient Care. These facilities serve as regional PCI (percutaneous coronary intervention) receiving centers and provide 24/7 heart attack care for patients throughout Kentucky and Southern Indiana.
 Norton Neuroscience Institute - Established in early 2009, provides treatment for complex neurological disorders through several areas, including pediatrics; stroke care; brain tumor treatment; spine care; epilepsy; movement disorders such as Parkinson's disease; headache and concussion treatment; trauma; injuries; and more.
 Norton Orthopedic Care - Provides orthopedic care in general orthopedics, joint replacement, injuries, trauma, pediatrics, oncology, spinal conditions and sports health. Norton Orthopedic Care received The Joint Commission's Gold Seal of Approval  for knee and hip replacement.
 Norton Spine Care
 Norton Sports Health - treating sports-related injuries  of the shoulder, elbow and knee.
 Norton Weight Management Services - Weight management services are offered. The staff includes two surgeons, two internal medicine physicians trained in bariatrics, nurses, dietitians and mental health professionals.
 Norton Women's Care - services including gynecologic care; obstetrics, including high-risk pregnancy care; newborn care with access to Level III and IV neonatal intensive care units; cancer prevention and treatment, including a breast health program; a women's heart and vascular center; and care for common midlife conditions.

Employment and market share
According to Business First of Louisville, Norton Healthcare is the Louisville area's third largest employer, with more than 17,000 employees.  Norton Healthcare employs some 4,000 nurses and has nearly 2,000 affiliated physicians. Additionally, Norton Healthcare has programs in place to support nursing students attending both public and private universities in Kentucky and Indiana. The Norton Healthcare Scholar Program is designed for nursing students to cover the cost of tuition, books, and room and board. In return, the student must work for Norton Healthcare for one month per $500 received after graduating. .
  
When compared with other healthcare providers in Louisville, Kentucky, Norton Healthcare is the market share leader in five major areas.  This includes 46% of all inpatient admissions, 61% of all births, 53% of all Emergency Department visits, 41% of all outpatient visits, and 50% of total surgeries.

See also
 List of major employers in Louisville, Kentucky

References

Further reading
 — coverage of efforts to start a union at Norton Audubon Hospital

External links
 Children’s Hospital — Official website

Companies based in Louisville, Kentucky
Health care companies established in 1886
1886 establishments in Kentucky
Medical and health organizations based in Kentucky
American companies established in 1886
Healthcare in Kentucky